One Time Bells is the first studio album by the pop rock band French Kicks. It was released in 2002.

Track listing
All songs written by French Kicks (Jamie Krents, Nick Stumpf, Matthew Stinchcomb, Josh Wise) unless otherwise noted.
 "Wrong Side" (Stumpf) – 3:28
 "When You Heard You" (Stumpf, Wise) – 2:33
 "Down Now" (Stumpf, Wise) – 4:01
 "Crying Just for Show" – 3:32
 "Close to Modern" (Stumpf) – 2:51
 "1985" (?) – 3:51
 "Right in Time" – 3:50
 "Trying Whining" (Stumpf) – 2:59
 "One Time Bells" (Stinchcomb, Stumpf) – 4:50
 "Where We Went Off" (Stumpf, Wise) – 3:05
 "Sunday Night Is Fair" – 3:43

Japanese Version

The Japanese and European versions of One Time Bells have a re-arranged track listing, extra tracks and different cover art.

 "When You Heard You"
 "Wrong Side" (Alt. Version)
 "Crying Just for Show"
 "Down Now"
 "Close to Modern"
 "Right in Time"
 "Trying Whining"
 "One Time Bells"
 "Where We Went Off"
 "Sunday Night Is Fair"
 "Piano"
 "1985"
 "Was It a Crime" (Demo Version)

European Version

 "When You Heard You"
 "Wrong Side" (Alt. Version)
 "Crying Just for Show"
 "Down Now"
 "Close to Modern"
 "Right in Time"
 "Trying Whining"
 "One Time Bells"
 "Where We Went Off"
 "Sunday Night Is Fair"
 "Piano"

French Kicks albums
2002 debut albums
Startime International albums